Rukmi is the ruler of Vidarbha according to the epic Mahabharata. He was the son of King Bhishmaka and the elder brother of Rukmini. The Harivamsa mentions that Rukmi was trained in the arts of warfare by the Kimpurusha Druma. Krishna married Rukmini by eloping with her from Vidarbha, even though Rukmi wanted to give her as a bride to the Chedi king Shishupala. He fought with Krishna, but was defeated. When Krishna was about to kill him, Rukmini begged that he spare her brother's life. Krishna agreed and let Rukmi go free, but not before having his head shaved as a visible sign of a warrior's defeat.

Rukmi never returned to his capital Kundinapuri in Vidarbha. Instead, he created another capital called Bhojakata to the west of Kundina and started ruling his kingdom from there. Rukmi’s daughter, Rukmavati, married Krishna’s son Pradyumna. Rukmavati and Pradyumna had a son, Aniruddha.

Rukmi was not accepted by Arjuna or Duryodhana as an ally in the Kurukshetra War because of his boastfulness. Thus, Rukmi's Vidarbha army stayed away from the Kurukshetra War, becoming a neutral army in the encounter between the Kauravas and the Pandavas.

The king was killed by Balarama because he cheated the deity in a game of dice, and insulted his Yadava heritage.

References 

 Characters in the Mahabharata